In type theory, an intersection type can be allocated to values that can be assigned both the type  and the type . This value can be given the intersection type  in an intersection type system.
Generally, if the ranges of values of two types overlap, then a value belonging to the intersection of the two ranges can be assigned the intersection type of these two types. Such a value can be safely passed as argument to functions expecting either of the two types.
Therefore, an object of type  can be safely passed to functions expecting an argument of type  and to functions expecting an argument of type .

Intersection types are composite data types. Similar to product types, they are used to assign several types to an object.
However, product types are assigned to tuples, so that each tuple element is assigned a particular product type component. 
In comparison, underlying objects of intersection types are not necessarily composite. A restricted form of intersection types are refinement types.

Intersection types are useful for describing overloaded functions.

Contemporary programming languages, including Ceylon, Flow, Java, Scala, TypeScript, and Whiley (see comparison of languages with intersection types), use intersection types to combine interface specifications and to express ad hoc polymorphism.
Complementing parametric polymorphism, intersection types may be used to avoid class hierarchy pollution from cross-cutting concerns and reduce boilerplate code, as shown in the TypeScript example below.

The type theoretic study of intersection types is referred to as the intersection type discipline.
Remarkably, program termination can be precisely characterized using intersection types.

TypeScript example 
TypeScript supports intersection types, improving expressiveness of the type system and reducing potential class hierarchy size, demonstrated as follows.

class Egg { private kind: "Egg" }
class Milk { private kind: "Milk" }

//produces eggs
class Chicken { produce() { return new Egg(); } }

//produces milk
class Cow { produce() { return new Milk(); } }

//produces a random number
class RandomNumberGenerator { produce() { return Math.random(); } }

//requires an egg
function eatEgg(egg: Egg) {
    return "I ate an egg.";
}

//requires milk
function drinkMilk(milk: Milk) {
    return "I drank some milk.";
}

The following program code defines the ad hoc polymorphic function  that invokes the member function  of the given object .
Specifically,  when applied to an argument of type  returns an object of type type , and when applied to an argument of type  returns an object of type type .
Ideally,  should not be applicable to any object having (possibly by chance) a  method.
//given a chicken, produces an egg; given a cow, produces milk
let animalToFood: ((_: Chicken) => Egg) & ((_: Cow) => Milk) =
    function (animal: any) {
        return animal.produce();
    };

Finally, the following program code demonstrates type safe use of the above definitions. 
var chicken = new Chicken();
var cow = new Cow();
var randomNumberGenerator = new RandomNumberGenerator();

console.log(chicken.produce()); //Egg { }
console.log(cow.produce()); //Milk { }
console.log(randomNumberGenerator.produce()); //0.2626353555444987

console.log(animalToFood(chicken)); //Egg { }
console.log(animalToFood(cow)); //Milk { }
//console.log(animalToFood(randomNumberGenerator)); //ERROR: Argument of type 'RandomNumberGenerator' is not assignable to parameter of type 'Cow'

console.log(eatEgg(animalToFood(chicken))); //I ate an egg.
//console.log(eatEgg(animalToFood(cow))); //ERROR: Argument of type 'Milk' is not assignable to parameter of type 'Egg'
console.log(drinkMilk(animalToFood(cow))); //I drank some milk.
//console.log(drinkMilk(animalToFood(chicken))); //ERROR: Argument of type 'Egg' is not assignable to parameter of type 'Milk'
The above program code has the following properties:
 Lines 5–7 print for the previously created objects the respective results (provided as comments) when invoking .
 Line 11, if uncommented, would result in a type error at compile time.
Therefore, if uncommented, line 14 (resp. 16) would result in a type error at compile time.

Comparison to inheritance 
However, in a larger setting, this could be disadvantageous.
Introducing new classes into a class hierarchy is not necessarily justified for cross-cutting concerns, or maybe outright impossible, for example when using an external library. 
Imaginably, the above example could be extended with the following classes:
 a class  that does not have a  method;
 a class  that has a  method returning ;
 a class  that has a  method, which can be used only once, returning .
This may require additional classes (or interfaces) specifying whether a produce method is available, whether the produce method returns food, and whether the produce method can be used repeatedly.
Overall, this may pollute the class hierarchy.

Comparison to duck typing 
The above minimalist example already shows that duck typing is less suited to realize the given scenario.

Comparison to function overloading 
In TypeScript, such a solution is almost identical to the provided example. 
Other programming languages, such as Java, require distinct implementations of the overloaded method.
This may lead to either code duplication or boilerplate code.

Comparison to the visitor pattern 
The above example can be realized using the visitor pattern.
It would require each animal class to implement an  method accepting an object implementing the interface  (adding non-local boilerplate code).
Unfortunately, the connection between the input type ( or ) and the result type ( or ) would be difficult to represent.

Limitations 
On the one hand, intersection types can be used to locally annotate different types to a function without introducing new classes (or interfaces) to the class hierarchy.
On the other hand, this approach requires all possible argument types and result types to be specified explicitly.
If the behavior of a function can be specified precisely by either a unified interface, parametric polymorphism, or duck typing, then the verbose nature of intersection types is unfavorable.
Therefore, intersection types should be considered complementary to existing specification methods.

Dependent intersection type 
A dependent intersection type, denoted , is a dependent type in which the type  may depend on the term variable .

Scala example 
Scala supports type declarations  as object members. This allows a type of an object member to depend on the value of another member, which is called a path-dependent type.
For example, the following program text defines a Scala trait Witness, which can be used to implement the singleton pattern.
trait Witness {
  type T
  val value: T {}
}
The above trait Witness declares the member T, which can be assigned a type as its value, and the member value, which can be assigned a value of type T.
The following program text defines an object booleanWitness as instance of the above trait Witness .
The object booleanWitness defines the type T as Boolean and the value value as true.
For example, executing System.out.println(booleanWitness.value) prints true on the console.
object booleanWitness extends Witness {
  type T = Boolean
  val value = true
}

Let  be the type (specifically, a record type) of objects having the member  of type .
In the above example, the object booleanWitness can be assigned the dependent intersection type .
The reasoning is as follows. The object booleanWitness has the member T that is assigned the type Boolean as its value.
Since Boolean is a type, the object booleanWitness has the type .
Additionally, the object booleanWitness has the member value that is assigned the value true of type Boolean.
Since the value of booleanWitness.T is Boolean, the object booleanWitness has the type .
Overall, the object booleanWitness has the intersection type .
Therefore, presenting self-reference as dependency, the object booleanWitness has the dependent intersection type .

Alternatively, the above minimalistic example can be described using dependent record types.
In comparison to dependent intersection types, dependent record types constitute a strictly more specialized type theoretic concept.

Intersection of a type family 
An intersection of a type family, denoted , is a dependent type in which the type  may depend on the term variable . In particular, if a term  has the type , then for each term  of type , the term  has the type . This notion is also called implicit Pi type, observing that the argument  is not kept at term level.

Comparison of languages with intersection types

References

Type theory
Type systems
Data types
Composite data types
Polymorphism (computer science)
TypeScript